Gol Baghi and Golbaghi may refer to:
 Golbaghi, Kermanshah
 Gol Baghi, Lorestan